Shimmer is the second and final album by Surgery. It was released in 1994 through Atlantic Records. Due to the death of frontman Sean McDonnell nine months after the album's release, the band broke up.

Critical reception
The New York Times wrote that Surgery "operates in the low end of rock's frequency spectrum, bringing the bass to the center of their sound, rarely hitting the high strings on the guitar, and churning out music that values density over melody." The Washington Post deemed the album "unexceptional electric blues-rock." The Philadelphia Inquirer wrote that the band's "riffing and tandem vocals are a modern-rock reduction of Bachman-Turner Overdrive."

Track listing

Personnel 
Surgery
Scott Kleber – guitar
John Lachapelle – bass guitar
John Leamy – drums
Sean McDonnell – vocals
Production and additional personnel
Billy Anderson – recording
Joe Barresi – mixing, recording
GGGarth – production, mixing
Allen Hori – art direction
Michael Lavine – photography
Anastasia Stefanik – cover model
Stephen Marcussen – mastering
Brian Scheuble – mixing
Surgery – production
Valerie Wagner – art direction, design

References

External links 
 

1994 albums
Atlantic Records albums
Albums produced by Garth Richardson
Surgery (band) albums
Albums recorded at Sound City Studios